Michael Görlitz (born 8 March 1987) is a German former professional footballer who played as a midfielder.

Career
Görlitz began his career with SB Phönix Nürnberg and joined later FC Holzheim Neumarkt. He was then scouted from 1. FC Nürnberg and signed in 2002 with Bayern Munich.

Earlier in his career, he played for Bayern Munich II, but never played for Bayern Munich's senior team.

On 8 June 2008, he went on a week-long trial with Halmstads BK and on 23 July 2008, Halmstads BK confirmed that they signed a contract with Görlitz. He made his debut for Halmstads BK on 11 August against Helsingborgs IF, both receiving a yellow card and scoring a goal, 2–0, in the first 10 minutes, he was later chosen man of the match, the game ended 3–1.

Görlitz was selected player of the year for Halmstads BK 2008 on 22 November.

After Halmstad's relegation to Superettan, Görlitz contract expired and he left the club, to return to Germany signing for FSV Frankfurt.

During the summer break of 2014 he moved to FC St. Pauli, signing a two-year contract with the Hamburg based 2. Bundesliga club.

On 12 June it was confirmed, that Görlitz had signed a contract with Arminia Bielefeld valid from 1 July 2015. In June 2017, after two years with Bielefeld, his expiring contract wasn not extended and he left the club.

In January 2018, Görlitz joined fourth-tier side 1860 Munich signing a contract until the end of the season with the option of an extension.

International
Görlitz has played 31 international games for Germany between U16 and U19 level.

Career statistics

Honours
Bayern Munich II
IFA Shield: 2005

Individual
 Halmstads BK Player of the year: 2008, 2009

References

External links
 
 

1987 births
Living people
Footballers from Nuremberg
German footballers
Association football midfielders
Germany youth international footballers
2. Bundesliga players
Regionalliga players
Allsvenskan players
FC Bayern Munich II players
Halmstads BK players
FSV Frankfurt players
FC St. Pauli players
FC St. Pauli II players
Arminia Bielefeld players
TSV 1860 Munich players
TSV 1860 Munich II players
German expatriate footballers
German expatriate sportspeople in Sweden
Expatriate footballers in Sweden